Poy is a surname of Chinese or Spanish origin. The name refers to:
Aldo Poy (born 1945), Argentine professional football player
José Poy (1926–1996), Argentine professional football player
Mauro Poy (born 1981), Argentine professional football player
Neville Poy (born 1935), Canadian plastic surgeon; husband of Vivienne Poy
Ronald Lou-Poy (contemporary), Canadian university chancellor
Vivienne Poy (born 1941), Chinese-Canadian fashion designer and politician from Ontario; Canadian senator since 1998
William Poy (1907–2002), Australian businessman of Chinese descent
Percy Hutton Fearon (1874–1948), British cartoonist who drew under the pseudonym Poy